Faculty of Medicine is one of the nine faculties in University of Peradeniya. It is considered to be one of the leading medical faculties in Sri Lanka which requires the highest entry qualification in GCE Advanced Level examination. It is the second faculty of Medicine in Sri Lanka.

Overview
Faculty of Medicine is situated at the Galaha Junction, Peradeniya, on the other side of the entrance to the Royal Botanical Garden of Peradeniya. In addition to the buildings located in the main campus, faculty operates a rural field practice area known as "Hindagala Community Health Project" covering 62 square kilometers and with a population of 20,000.
 Departments, units and centers of the Faculty of Medicine

Department of Anaesthesiology & Critical Care
Department of Anatomy
Department of Biochemistry
Department of Community Medicine
Department of Forensic Medicine
Department of Obstetrics and Gynaecology
Department of Medical Education
Department of Medicine
Department of Microbiology
Department of Paediatrics
Department of Parasitology
Department of Pathology
Department of Pharmacology
Department of Physiology
Department of Psychiatry
Department of Radiology
Department of Surgery
English Language Teaching Unit (ELTU)
Nuclear Medicine Unit (NMU)
Health Emergency & Disaster Management Training Centre(HEDMaTC)
Research and Development Unit
Sport Sciences
Medical Library
South Asian Clinical Toxicology Research Collaboration (SACTRC)
Peradeniya Medical School Alumni Association (PeMSAA)
Center for Research in Tropical Medicine (CRTM)
Center for Education, Research & Training on Kidney Diseases
e-Library
Technical Resources Centre (TRC)

History
Faculty of Medicine is established in the University of Peradeniya in 1962 under the provisions made by the Ministry of Health. Professor Seneka Bibile; Professor of Pharmacology, who was elected Dean of this Faculty of Medicine in 1967, is largely responsible for the faculty's growth.  He established the Medical Education Unit in the Faculty, which became a World Health Organization recognized teacher training center for health professionals in the South-East Asian Region. And it was in his period, the plans for the building of a teaching hospital at the Peradeniya Campus were initiated. This 940-bed hospital, Teaching Hospital of Peradeniya was completed in 1980 and does a valuable service to the area.

Hospitals affiliated to the faculty
The students of the faculty of Medicine receive their clinical training at 6 hospitals currently. They are;
 Teaching Hospital, Peradeniya: Serves as the Professorial Unit for the training of final year medical students
 National Hospital, Kandy
 Sirimavo Bandaranaike Specialized Children's Hospital, Peradeniya.
 Teaching Hospital, Gampola
 Base Hospital, Mawanella
 STD Clinic, District Hospital, Katugastota
 Teaching hospital, Kegalle
 M.O.H Office Kandy.
 M.O.H Office Kadugannawa.
 M.O.H Office Peradeniya.
 M.O.H Office Doluwa.
 Specialized Chest Clinic Bogambara

Deans of the faculty
Seneka Bibile (1966-1969)
G.E.Tennakoon (1969-1970)
A.D.P Jayatilake (1970-1972)
B.A Jayaweera (1972-1975)
H Ranasinghe (1975)
R.G. Panabokke (1975-1981)
Malcolm Fernando (1981-1984)
V Basnayake (1984-1986)
Malcolm Fernando (1986-1994)
Nimal Senanayake (1994-1999)
Malini Udupihille (1999-2002)
Ananda Wijekoon (2002-to 2005)
Chula Goonasekara 
I. Amarasinghe 
Gamini Buthpitiya (2010-2013)
M.D Lamawansa (2013-2015)
Vajira S. Weerasinghe(2015–2018)
Asiri S. Abayagunawardana(2018-2021)
Vasanthi Pinto(2021–Present)

References

External links 
Official website of the Faculty of Medicine, University of Peradeniya
www.med.pdn.ac.lk
www.pemsaa.org.lk

Medicine
Peradeniya